Tonči Gabrić (born 11 November 1961) is a Croatian retired professional footballer who played as a goalkeeper.

Club career
Gabrić played before 1991 in Yugoslav clubs Čelik Zenica and HNK Rijeka. After Yugoslav dissolution, he played for two years in Greece with PAOK (1991–1993), and in Croatia with Pazinka (1993–1994), and Hajduk Split (1994–1999).

International career
He made his debut for Croatia in an October 1990 friendly match against the United States, coming on as a 70th-minute substitute for Dražen Ladić. As Croatia was still part of Yugoslavia at the time, the game is deemed unofficial. He has earned a total of 9 caps (two of them not official), scoring no goals. He was the regular reserve goalkeeper of the national team between 1990 and 1997 and was part of the Euro 1996 squad. His final international was a September 1997 World Cup qualification match away against Denmark.

Personal life
His son Drago is also playing football in midfielder role with HNK Rijeka. Drago's twin Paškvalina has been one of the best female footballers in Croatia for a number of years playing for Viktoria Slavonski Brod and ŽNK Zagreb as well as being on trial with Charlton Athletic FC of England.

Honours

Player
RNK Split
Croatian Republic League - South: 1983–84

Hajduk Split
Croatian First League:  1994–95
Croatian Cup: 1994–95
Croatian Super Cup: 1994

Orders
 Order of Danica Hrvatska with face of Franjo Bučar - 1995

References

External links

1961 births
Living people
Footballers from Split, Croatia
Association football goalkeepers
Yugoslav footballers
Croatian footballers
Croatia international footballers
UEFA Euro 1996 players
RNK Split players
NK Solin players
NK Čelik Zenica players
HNK Hajduk Split players
HNK Rijeka players
PAOK FC players
NK Pazinka players
Yugoslav First League players
Yugoslav Second League players
Super League Greece players
Croatian Football League players
Croatian expatriate footballers
Expatriate footballers in Greece
Croatian expatriate sportspeople in Greece
HNK Hajduk Split non-playing staff